E. Hugo Siles-Alvarado, was the Permanent Representative to the United Nations for Bolivia from July 2007 to February 2009.  He is married and the father of three children.

Education
Siles-Alvarado attended the University of Uppsala, Sweden, where he received a Master of Science degree in 1975.  His undergraduate work was performed at the University of San Andrés in La Paz; Macalester College, Minnesota and the University of Minnesota in the United States.

Career
Prior to his appointment, Siles-Alvarado worked with Varian Medical Systems from 2004 to 2005.  During the same period, he was with the Las Vegas Education Department, Las Vegas, Nevada in the United States, as a physics instructor.  For several months in 2004, he was a professor of basic science with the Catholic University in Cochabamba, Bolivia. Before his work as a professor of basic science, he worked in the field of medical physics in Bolivia, Ecuador and the United States, dealing with radiation therapy and radiological protection.  In 1973 he began a teaching career, which encompassed physics and numerical analysis, at several Bolivian universities.  His first teaching position was with the University of San Andres in La Paz.

See also
List of Permanent Representatives to the UN

References

United Nations Press Release - Hugo Siles-Alvarado, retrieved 2008-09-18

Living people
Permanent Representatives of Bolivia to the United Nations
Year of birth missing (living people)